Akhilesh Reddy is a British physician-scientist. He studied on the MB/PhD programme at the University of Cambridge and received a PhD from the MRC Laboratory of Molecular Biology. He was a Wellcome Trust Senior Fellow in Clinical Sciences at the University of Cambridge. He is currently an associate professor of pharmacology at the University of Pennsylvania.

Research

Reddy's research group discovered the existence of circadian clocks in human red blood cells (erythrocytes) in 2011.  Scientists previously thought that mammals could not have a circadian clock without DNA, RNA production, or protein production. Thus, the red cell oscillations might be considered a type of biochemical or chemical oscillation, over a long (24 hour) time scale. Sir Christopher Dobson lauded the findings and commented that this was akin to well established short period oscillations that occur in chemical systems. Other researchers in the circadian rhythms field called the work "exceptional" in post-publication peer review on Faculty of 1000.

In collaboration with Andrew Millar's group in Edinburgh, Reddy's group also showed the existence of 24-hour oscillations that do not require RNA production in marine algae. This was the first demonstration of circadian rhythms without the formation of new RNA in higher organisms.

In 2012, Reddy's group showed that redox circadian oscillations are pervasive across evolutionary time, from bacteria to humans, using a new molecular window into the clock – peroxiredoxin proteins. Nobel laureate Michael Rosbash stated that "A more recent challenge to the PER-CLK transcription-centric animal model is the proposed role of metabolism and specifically peroxiredoxin hyperoxidation in circadian rhythms. A set of experiments showed that these rhythms are independent of transcriptional rhythms in human red blood cells as well as in fly and mouse systems (O'Neill and Reddy 2011; O'Neill et al. 2011; Edgar et al. 2012). Key aspects of the red blood cell experiments were independently replicated (Cho et al. 2014). As mammalian red blood cells lack nuclei and therefore transcription, aspects of this hypothesis are likely to be correct."

In 2018, Reddy's team showed the intimate links between core glucose metabolism and circadian transcriptional oscillations, as well as non-canonical circadian rhythms in clock-less fruit fly cells. These findings show that there continues to be an incomplete understanding of molecular circadian rhythms in a range of organisms.

Controversy

In December 2019, Reddy underwent a hearing at the Medical Practitioners Tribunal regarding alleged overpayment by both University College London and the University of Cambridge. Whilst a decision was made to suspend Professor Reddy for nine months from the medical practice in the United Kingdom; the case is subject to an appeal in the High Court, and sanctions have not yet been applied.

Awards 
 2011: EMBO Young Investigator Award.
 2012: Lister Prize.
 2012: Colworth Medal.
 2013: Academy of Medical Sciences Foulkes Foundation Medal.
 2014: Elected to American Society for Clinical Investigation (ASCI).
 2014: FEBS Anniversary Prize.
 2015: Linacre Medal and Lecture (Royal College of Physicians).

References

21st-century British medical doctors
British scientists
Wellcome Trust
Living people
20th-century births
Chronobiologists
Year of birth missing (living people)
Members of the American Society for Clinical Investigation